The Emperor Valley Zoo Staff Association is a trade union in Trinidad and Tobago. It organises monthly paid employees at the Emperor Valley Zoo in Port of Spain.

See also

 List of trade unions

Trade unions in Trinidad and Tobago